Rubilena Rojas (born 11 August 1981) is a Venezuelan softball player. She competed in the women's tournament at the 2008 Summer Olympics.

References

1981 births
Living people
Venezuelan softball players
Olympic softball players of Venezuela
Softball players at the 2008 Summer Olympics
Sportspeople from Maracay